Afro Bros (18 June 1990, 10 June 1989), better known by their stage name Afro Bros, are a DJ and record production duo. Notable productions include the songs "X" and "Instagram".

Career 
In 2017, Afro Bros collaborated with Boaz van de Beatz and Ronnie Flex, and produced two songs, "Energie" and "Come Again" which later received a Buma Award.

Afro Bros co-produced the song "Sua Cara" with Major Lazer, and it later won a Latin Grammy Award.

In 2018, Afro Bros collaborated with Jeon, and produced the track "X", featuring Nicky Jam and J Balvin which has been viewed 1.9 billion times on YouTube and also won a Buma Export Award as well as being nominated for Latin Grammy Awards.

In July 2019, the duo produced the song "Instagram" with Dimitri Vegas & Like Mike, David Guetta, Daddy Yankee and Natti Natasha. In 2019, they also worked with Jamaican singer Sean Kingston and released the song "How Many Times".

Afro Bros signed a contract with Universal Music Group in 2020.

Discography

Singles

Production

Awards

References 

Dutch DJs
Dutch record producers
Dutch musical duos
Electronic dance music duos
Record production duos